Keller is an unincorporated community and census-designated place (CDP) in southwestern Ferry County in the northeastern part of the U.S. state of Washington. As of the 2010 census, the population was 234.

History
The town is located in the valley of the Sanpoil River, and was founded in 1898 by Baby Ray Peone, a local fisherman. The town was located in the area known as "God's Country" (or "Old Keller" to the locals). At its height the town had an estimated population of 3,500 and even featured a minor league baseball team and red light district. The series of moves seriously reduced its population over time.

The town is encompassed by the Colville Indian Reservation, which has an estimated population of roughly 1,200 people mostly of Native American descent and primarily members of the Sanpoil tribe, one of the Twelve Tribes that make up the Colville Confederated Tribes and one of the few Indian Nations that was never relocated by order of the U.S. government.

Mount Tolman mining proposal

From 2004 to 2006 the town of Keller was the center of attention after the Colville Tribes' controversial decision to explore the possibility of opening up an open-pit molybdenum mine on Mount Tolman in the San Poil Valley. The proposal to mine also included the use of acid leaching to retrieve the metals being mined, and given the mountain's short distance to the Columbia River the result would have been disastrous. Other groups also claimed the mountain's spiritual connection to the Sanpoil Tribe (the name "Tolman" comes from the Sanpoil dialect, Tulameen meaning "Red Paint") because many of the tribe's legends and medicines are located on the mountain itself. The group that originally sent in the proposal for the mine mostly focused on the tribe's stagnant economy and the monetary value a molybdenum mine would produce due to the high demand of the substance, a claim that the mining opposition rebutted when the evidence showed that the price of molybdenum was unpredictable and the only consistent price range was when it fell between $0.50 to $1.50 between 1955 and 1982. When the issue was brought to vote by the Colville Tribes the proposal was turned down in three legislative districts, winning approval only in the Inchelium district.

References

http://www.historylink.org/essays/output.cfm?file_id=7227

Census-designated places in Washington (state)
Census-designated places in Ferry County, Washington
Populated places established in 1898
Populated places in the Okanagan Country